KZIP (1310 AM) is a radio station broadcasting a Regional Mexican format. Licensed to Amarillo, Texas, United States, the station serves the Amarillo area. The station is currently owned by Christian Ministries of the Valley, Inc.

On April 17, 2017, KZIP changed their format to regional Mexican, branded as "La Caliente" (format moved from KQFX 104.3 Borger, which began stunting).

FM translator
In addition to the main station on 1310 kHz, KZIP is relayed by an FM translator in order to widen its broadcasts area and to provide listeners with stereo high fidelity sound.

References

External links
 La Caliente 92.7 & 1310 Facebook

ZIP
Regional Mexican radio stations in the United States
ZIP